The 1967 Coppa Italia Final was the final of the 1966–67 Coppa Italia. The match was played on 14 June 1967 between Milan and Padova. Milan won 1–0.

Match

References 
Coppa Italia 1966/67 statistics at rsssf.com
 https://www.calcio.com/calendario/ita-coppa-italia-1966-1967-finale/2/
 https://www.worldfootball.net/schedule/ita-coppa-italia-1966-1967-finale/2/

Coppa Italia Finals
Coppa Italia Final 1967
Calcio Padova matches